Wiel Arets Architects is an Amsterdam, Maastricht, and Zurich based multidisciplinary architecture and design practice founded by Wiel Arets in 1983.

Notable projects

Fashion Shop Beltgens, (Maastricht, 1986-1987)
Maastricht Academy of Art and Architecture, (Maastricht, 1989–1993)
AZL Pension Fund Headquarters, (Heerlen, 1990–1995)
KNSM Island Apartment Tower, (Amsterdam, 1990–1996)
Police Station, (Vaals, 1993–1995)
Tower Hoge Heren, (Rotterdam, 1993–2001)
Police Station, (Cuijk, 1994–1997)
Lensvelt Factory & Office, (Breda, 1995-1998)
University Library, (Utrecht, 1997–2004)
Hedge House (Wijlre, 1998–2001)
Sport Campus Leidsche Rijn, (Utrecht, 1998–2006)
Kwakkel Office & Showroom, (Apeldoorn, 1999–2002)
Glaspaleis, (Heerlen, 1999–2003)
E' Tower, (Eindhoven, 2000-2013)
Housing Kloostertuin, (Apeldoorn, 2000–2006)
B' Tower, (Rotterdam, 2000-2013)
Tea & Coffee Towers, (Limited Edition for Alessi, 2001–2003)
Four Towers Osdorp, (Amsterdam, 2002–2008)
Living Madrid, (Madrid, 2002–2008)
Gallery Borzo, (Amsterdam, 2004–2006)
Euroborg Stadium, (Groningen, 2004–2006)
Il Bagno dOt Alessi, (Alessi, 2004-2007) 
H' House, (Maastricht, 2005–2009)
V' Tower, (Eindhoven, 2006–2009)
Hotel Zenden, (Maastricht, 2006–2009)
V' House, (Maastricht, 2006-2013)
A' House, (Tokyo, Japan, 2007-2014)
Campus Hoogvliet, (Rotterdam, 2007-2014)
The Post, (Maastricht, 2008-2013)
Regiocentrale Zuid, (Maasbracht, 2008-2014)
Truman Plaza, (Berlin, 2008-2014) 
Schwäbisch Media, (Ravensburg, 2008-2013)
Allianz Headquarters, (Richti Wallisellen, Zürich, 2008-2014)
The Double, (Amsterdam, 2010-2019) 
The IJhal (Amsterdam Centraal Station, Amsterdam, 2010-2016)
AvB Tower, (The Hague, 2010-2013)
Blumenhaus, (Zürich, 2011-2019)
Europaallee 'Site D', (Zürich, 2012-2019)
Van der Valk Hotel, (Amsterdam, 2014-2020)
'Am Hirschgarten', (Munich, 2014-2020)
Antwerp Tower, (Antwerp, 2017-2020)
Bahrain Bay Tower, (Manama, Bahrain, 2015-2022)

References

External links

 WAA

Architecture firms of the Netherlands